Daniel Paul Collins (born July 4, 1963) is a United States circuit judge of the United States Court of Appeals for the Ninth Circuit.

Early life and career 

Collins earned his Bachelor of Arts, summa cum laude, from Harvard College. He received his Juris Doctor from Stanford Law School in 1988, where he served on the Stanford Law Review. After graduating from law school, Collins served as a law clerk to Judge Dorothy Wright Nelson of the United States Court of Appeals for the Ninth Circuit from 1988 to 1989 and then to Justice Antonin Scalia of the Supreme Court of the United States from 1991 to 1992.

Collins then worked as an Assistant United States Attorney for the Central District of California and as an attorney-advisor in the United States Department of Justice Office of Legal Counsel. He later served as an Associate United States Deputy Attorney General and in that role participated substantially in the drafting of the PROTECT Act of 2003. From 2003 to 2019, Collins was a partner at Munger, Tolles & Olson. In 2007, he was considered but not chosen for the position of United States Attorney for the Central District of California. In 2009, he represented Phillip Morris in opposing a ban on tobacco sales in drug stores in San Francisco. In 2017, he served on the Federal Courts Advisory Committee on Evidence Rules.

Federal judicial service 

On October 10, 2018, President Donald Trump announced his intent to nominate Collins to serve as a United States Circuit Judge of the United States Court of Appeals for the Ninth Circuit. On October 11, 2018, Senator Dianne Feinstein said the White House had not consulted her on the nomination, and that she would oppose Senate confirmation of Collins and two other circuit court nominees. On November 13, 2018, his nomination was sent to the Senate. President Trump nominated Collins to the seat vacated by Judge Harry Pregerson, who assumed senior status on December 11, 2015. On January 3, 2019, his nomination was returned to the President under Rule XXXI, Paragraph 6 of the United States Senate.

On January 30, 2019, President Trump indicated that he would renominate Collins to a Ninth Circuit vacancy. On February 6, 2019, his nomination was sent to the Senate. On March 13, 2019, a hearing on his nomination was held before the Senate Judiciary Committee. On April 4, 2019, his nomination was reported out of committee by a 12–10 vote. On May 20, 2019, the Senate invoked cloture on his nomination by a 51–43 vote, and on the following day, May 21, the Senate confirmed his nomination by a 53–46 vote. He received his judicial commission on May 22, 2019.

Notable cases

On May 22, 2020, Collins dissented in a 2–1 decision which ruled that California Governor Gavin Newsom's order to close churches was constitutional. On May 29, a majority on the U.S. Supreme Court declined to overrule the 9th Circuit's ruling. However, the issue had shifted from whether closing churches was constitutional to whether limiting church capacity was constitutional.

On June 26, 2020, Collins again dissented in a pair of 2–1 decisions ruling that President Trump illegally redirected $2.5 billion in military funds to build portions of a border wall in California, Arizona, and New Mexico.

On April 27, 2021, Collins partially dissented in a qualified immunity case where a 13 year old was coerced into confessing a murder that he did not commit. While the majority granted the officers qualified immunity in part, Collins would have granted them qualified immunity in full.

In Brach v. Newsom, Collins ruled that private schools were exempt from COVID-19 restrictions.

See also 
 List of law clerks of the Supreme Court of the United States (Seat 9)

References

Selected publications 
 
  Hein paid access.

External links 
 
 

1963 births
Living people
21st-century American lawyers
21st-century American judges
Assistant United States Attorneys
California lawyers
Federalist Society members
Harvard College alumni
Judges of the United States Court of Appeals for the Ninth Circuit
Law clerks of the Supreme Court of the United States
Lawyers from Los Angeles
People associated with Munger, Tolles & Olson
Stanford Law School alumni
United States court of appeals judges appointed by Donald Trump
United States Department of Justice lawyers